West Chazy is a hamlet and census-designated place in the town of Chazy in Clinton County, New York, United States. The population was 529 at the 2010 census.

Geography
West Chazy is located in the southwestern part of the town of Chazy along the Little Chazy River, which flows northeastward to Lake Champlain. New York State Route 22 passes through the hamlet, leading south  to Plattsburgh, the county seat, and north  to Mooers.

Demographics

References

Hamlets in New York (state)
Census-designated places in New York (state)
Census-designated places in Clinton County, New York
Hamlets in Clinton County, New York